The John Van Buskirk Farm House is a single-family home located at 7348 Coldwater Road in Davison, Michigan. It was listed on the National Register of Historic Places in 1983.

History
John Van Buskirk was an early settler in the area, and constructed this house in about 1850. Van Buskirk was active in the community, serving as Overseer of the Poor from 1857 to 1858 and later as the President of the Union Lyceum Building Society, an organization founded to collect funds to build a church.

Description
The John Van Buskirk Farm House is a Greek Revival structure, fronted by a recessed porch with decorative paneled posts and overhead bargeboard. The window openings are symmetrically placed and have pedimented hoods. The main section of the house has unusual paneled corner pilasters and a wide friezealong the eavesline.

References

		
National Register of Historic Places in Genesee County, Michigan
Greek Revival architecture in Michigan
Houses completed in 1850